The 2020 OFC Champions League group stage was played from 15 February to 7 March 2020. A total of 16 teams competed in the group stage to decide the eight places in the knockout stage of the 2020 OFC Champions League.

Draw
The draw and the hosts of the qualifying stage were announced by the OFC on 13 December 2019. The 16 teams (14 teams entering the group stage and two teams advancing from the qualifying stage) were drawn into four groups of four.The champions of the seven developed associations, and the runners-up of New Caledonia, by virtue of having the best second team in the 2019 OFC Champions League, were drawn into Positions 1 and 2 of Groups A–D.
The runners-up of the six developed associations apart from New Caledonia were drawn into Position 3 of Groups A–D and Position 4 of Groups A–B. Teams from the same association could not be drawn into the same group.
The winners and runners-up of the qualifying stage, whose identity was not known at the time of the draw, were drawn into Position 4 of Groups C–D.

Format
The four teams in each group played each other on a round-robin basis at a centralised venue. The winners and runners-up of each group advanced to the quarter-finals of the knockout stage.

Schedule
Matches were played on the following dates and venues:
Group A matches were played between 16–22 February 2020 in Papua New Guinea.
Group B matches were played between 15–21 February 2020 in Vanuatu.
Group C matches were played between 1–7 March 2020 in New Caledonia.
Group D matches were played between 1–7 March 2020 in Tahiti.
The schedule of each matchday was as follows.

Groups

Group A
All times were local, PGT (UTC+10).

Group B
All times were local, VUT (UTC+11).

Group C
All times were local, NCT (UTC+11).

Group D
Following a proposal by the Local Organising Committee in Tahiti, the OFC agreed to change the venue for Group D from Stade Pater, Pirae to Stade Municipal de Mahina, Mahina. However, due to heavy rain, the first match day of Group D would be played at Stade Pater after Stade Mahina was deemed not suitable for use by the Oceania Football Confederation in conjunction with the Local Organising Committee. All times were local, TAHT (UTC−10).

Notes

References

External links
OFC Champions League 2020, oceaniafootball.com

2
February 2020 sports events in Oceania
March 2020 sports events in Oceania
International association football competitions hosted by Papua New Guinea
International association football competitions hosted by Vanuatu
International association football competitions hosted by New Caledonia
International association football competitions hosted by French Polynesia